Yelena Vladimirovna Prokhorova (born April 16, 1978) is a Russian heptathlete who won a silver medal at the 2000 Summer Olympics. She is also the 2001 world champion in this event. She was born at Kemerovo, in Siberia.

In 2005 she tested positive for a banned substance in an out-of-competition test. She was suspended by the IAAF from October 2005 to October 2006.

International competitions

Personal bests

See also
List of doping cases in athletics
List of Olympic medalists in athletics (women)
List of 2000 Summer Olympics medal winners
List of World Athletics Championships medalists (women)
List of IAAF World Indoor Championships medalists (women)
List of European Athletics Indoor Championships medalists (women)

References

1978 births
Living people
People from Kemerovo
Sportspeople from Kemerovo Oblast
Russian heptathletes
Olympic athletes of Russia
Olympic silver medalists for Russia
Olympic silver medalists in athletics (track and field)
Athletes (track and field) at the 2000 Summer Olympics
Athletes (track and field) at the 2004 Summer Olympics
Medalists at the 2000 Summer Olympics
Goodwill Games medalists in athletics
Competitors at the 2001 Goodwill Games
World Athletics Championships athletes for Russia
World Athletics Championships medalists
World Athletics Championships winners
European Athletics Indoor Championships winners
Russian Athletics Championships winners
Doping cases in athletics
Russian sportspeople in doping cases